Dominic Thiem was the defending champion, but lost to Diego Schwartzman in the semifinals.

Marco Cecchinato won the title, defeating Schwartzman in the final, 6–1, 6–2.

Seeds
The top four seeds received a bye into the second round.

Draw

Finals

Top half

Bottom half

Qualifying

Seeds

Qualifiers

Qualifying draw

First qualifier

Second qualifier

Third qualifier

Fourth qualifier

References

External links
 Main draw
 Qualifying draw

2019 ATP Tour
2019 Singles